Ettridge may refer to:

 Ben Ettridge, an Australian wheelchair basketball coach
 Christopher Ettridge, an English actor
 David Ettridge, an Australian politician
 The Ettridge Collection, a collection of literature about domestic appliance donated by the namesake's estate to the British Library

See also
 Royal Bank of Scotland plc v Etridge (No 2), a leading English case on when undue influence can vitiate contracts
 Ethridge (disambiguation)
 Etheridge (disambiguation)